Chang Jung-Koo (born February 4, 1963) is a South Korean former professional boxer who competed from 1980 to 1991. He held the WBC light-flyweight title from 1983 to 1988.

Professional career
Chang took the tough road to becoming a world champion. In Chang's 15th pro fight, he faced former WBA flyweight champion Alfonso Lopez. Chang knocked out Lopez in the 3rd round.  Next, Chang faced future IBF flyweight champion Jong-Kwan Chung, stopping Chung in the 6th round. In his 18th fight, and last before challenging for his first world title, Chang scored a 10-round unanimous decision over former WBC light-flyweight champion Amado Ursua.

In Chang's first world title try, he lost to Hilario Zapata of Panama by a 15-round split decision in 1982, by scores of 148–145, 142-144 and 144–147. However, in a rematch held in Seoul, he avenged that loss and became WBC light-flyweight world champion by knocking out Zapata at 2:46 of the 3rd round.

Chang then went on to establish a then-world record for the most defenses as world light flyweight champion, defending the title successfully 16 times between 1983 and 1988 when he retired.

In his first defense, he defeated Masaharu Inami and followed it with a win over future champion German Torres.

In 1984, he defeated future champion, Sot Chitalada, former champion Katsuo Tokashiki and Tadashi Kuramochi.

He started 1985 with a narrow majority decision in a rematch with German Torres. The outcome was determined by a single point on one judge's scorecard. Later in the year, he defeated Francisco Montiel and Jorge Cano.

In 1986, Chang faced Torres in a third meeting, this time defeating him by unanimous decision. He followed it with a rematch victory over Francisco Montiel and a knockout over future champion Hideyuki Ohashi.

After securing victories over Efren Pinto and Agustin Garcia in 1987, he faced future champion Isidro Perez. In a hard-fought battle, Perez dropped Chang in the opening round, however, the referee failed to rule it as such. Chang was ultimately awarded a close unanimous decision victory.

After a TKO victory in a rematch over Hideyuki Ohashi in 1988, Chang announced his retirement. Originally retired in 1988, Jang Jung-gu's first wife was a marriage swindler. From the beginning, the wife married only for Jang Jung-gu's fortune, and after the marriage, she continued to steal Jang Jung-gu's fortune for her family. When he stole almost all of his assets, he deliberately caused a feud with Jang Jung-gu, and eventually, when he divorced, he ripped off the alimony, turning Jang Jung-gu into a penniless beggar and fled to a foreign country. This is why Jang Jung-gu became financially difficult despite winning 15 championships, which forced him to return to active duty in 1989. However, financial difficulties pushed him back into the ring in 1989 when he challenged and lost to Humberto González, who was the WBC light-flyweight champion at the time.

After moving up to the flyweight division, he challenged WBC flyweight champion Sot Chitalada who he had defeated several years prior. In a closely contested bout, Chang lost a disputed majority decision.

Chitalada then lost that title to Muangchai Kittikasem, prompting Chang to challenge the newly crowned champion. Chang dropped the champion three times, however, Kittikasem rallied back to stop him in the final round. Chang announced his retirement immediately after.

Chang's record for successive title defenses in the 108-pound division would soon be broken by fellow South Korean boxer Yuh Myung-Woo, who successfully defended his WBA light flyweight title 17 times in his first reign between 1985 and 1991.

Chang had a record of 38 wins and 4 losses, with 17 wins by knockout.

In June 2010, Chang and 12 other boxing personalities were inducted in the International Boxing Hall of Fame. He became the first Korean boxer to be inducted in the prestigious boxing hall of fame, and the 5th Asian boxer to receive the honor.

Professional boxing record

See also 
 List of light-flyweight boxing champions
 List of Koreans
 Sport in South Korea

References

External links 
 

1963 births
Living people
Sportspeople from Busan
International Boxing Hall of Fame inductees
World Boxing Council champions
Light-flyweight boxers
World light-flyweight boxing champions
South Korean male boxers